Maxwell Keith "Max" Robinson (15 December 1932 – 31 March 2014) was an Australian politician.

He was born in Hobart. In 1976 he was elected to the Tasmanian House of Assembly as a Liberal member for Denison. He was defeated in 1979.

References

1932 births
2014 deaths
Liberal Party of Australia members of the Parliament of Tasmania
Members of the Tasmanian House of Assembly